Jaspar von Oertzen (1912–2008) was a German stage, film and television actor.

Selected filmography
 Trouble with Jolanthe (1934)
 Comrades at Sea (1938)
 The Merciful Lie (1939)
 Police Report (1939)
 Bismarck (1940)
 Riding for Germany (1941)
 Münchhausen (1943)
 The Golden Spider (1943)
 Young Hearts (1944)
 The Silent Guest (1945)
 Kolberg (1945)
 The Magic Face (1951)
 Monks, Girls and Hungarian Soldiers (1952)
 The Last Waltz (1953)
 A Song Goes Round the World (1958)

References

Bibliography 
 Giesen, Rolf.  Nazi Propaganda Films: A History and Filmography. McFarland, 2003.

External links 
 

1912 births
2008 deaths
People from Schwerin
German male film actors
German male television actors
German male stage actors